Moumita Gupta is a Bengali film and television actress.

Works

Films 
 Ebong Kiriti (2017)
 Bhroon (Unreleased)
 Mone Pore Aajo Seidin (2011)
 Bhumiputra (2006)
 Je Jon Thake Majhkhane (2006)
 Nagardola (2005)
 Ek Mutho Chhabi (2005)
 Moner Majhe Tumi (2003)
 Shakti (2004)
 Shubho Mahurat (2003)
 Annadaata (2002)
 ''Santan (1999 film)

Television 
 Checkmate as Supti Roy Burman
 Ek akasher niche
 Ekdin Pratidin
 Raat Bhor Brishti as Srimati Sen
 Khela as Aapa
 Rajpath as Rama Sen
Erao Shotru as Seema Mukherjee
 Bou Kotha Kao as Neelima
 Saat Paake Bandha as Domoyonti Sen
 @Bhalobasha.com as Rajlekha Chowdhury
 Aanchol as Aditi Roy (later replaced by Swagat Mukherjee)
 Sokhi as Charu Roy
 Kiranmala as Raaj Mata 
 Aaj Aari Kal Bhab as Brinda Ganguly
 Goyenda Ginni as Neelima Banerjee
 Pita as Goirika Sen
 Stree as Shakuntala Deb
 Adorini as Trisha Sen
 Vanumotir Khel as Amba Sarkar
 Kora Pakhi as Radharani Banerjee
 Mohor as Malobika Roy Choudhury
 Sarbojoya as Madhuraa Chowdhury
 Jagaddhatri as Boidehi Mukherjee

See also 
 Locket Chatterjee
 Debolina Dutta
 Kanchana Moitra
 Laboni Sarkar

References

External links 
 

Living people
Actresses in Bengali cinema
Bengali television actresses
Indian film actresses
Indian television actresses
21st-century Indian actresses
Year of birth missing (living people)